KRNK (96.7 FM, "Rock 96.7") is a radio station in Casper, Wyoming broadcasting a mainstream rock format. The station is currently owned by Townsquare Media.

History
KRNK started out as KMGW "Magic 94", an adult contemporary radio station in the Summer of 1989. In the mid-1990s it became an alternative music station. Later in the decade it was re-branded as "Star 94" and converted back to its original AC format feeding programming from ABC Radio's "Hits & Favorites" network. It moved to its current location on the FM dial in 2001. During the Christmas season local DJs broadcast holiday music. On September 22, 2008, at 6 a.m. Mountain Time, the radio station changed to its current classic rock format. Just before the switch the station allowed website visitors to vote for the new format, the station advertised several logos, all relating to the given format.

The station was assigned the call letters KMLD on September 15, 1997. On August 31, 2001, the station changed its call sign to KMGW, on September 3, 2009, to the current KRNK.

The station previously had featured Bob & Tom in the morning, but now only has local personalities The Jeff, T-Roy, and Jon Michaels.

Signal
As with almost every local FM station in the area, the broadcasting tower is located south of town on Casper Mountain. With its 2,700 watt effective radiated power, the station is audible throughout most of Natrona County, and into Converse County, Wyoming. With a car radio or a radio with a sufficient antenna, the station likely can be heard in the town of Midwest, Wyoming, north of Casper.

Logos

References

External links
Official Website

RNK
Radio stations established in 1989
Mainstream rock radio stations in the United States
Townsquare Media radio stations